Doi Luang National Park is one of the biggest national parks in Northern Thailand.

It covers the Mae Suai, Phan and Wiang Pa Pao districts of Chiang Rai Province, Wang Nuea and Ngao of Lampang Province as well as Mae Chai and Mueang Phayao of Phayao Province.

Description
Doi Luang National Park, with an area of 730,927 rai ~  is located in the northwesternmost mountain chains of the Phi Pan Nam Range and was established in 1990 by combining the area of four existing parks.

1,426 m high Doi Luang, a mountain located towards the northern end of the park in Mae Chai District, should not be confused with Doi Luang, with an altitude of 1,694 m the highest mountain of the Phi Pan Nam Range, that is located about 30 km further south in the same mountain chain. The sources of the Wang and the Lao River are in this mountainous area. The park also has rugged rock formations and scenic waterfalls such as Namtok Pu Kaeng, Namtok Cham Pa Thong and Namtok Wang Kaew.

Flora and fauna
Trees in the protected area include Mesua ferrea, Hopea odorata, Toona ciliata, Lagerstroemia tomentosa and Irvingia malayana.

Animals in the park area include the Asian black bear, sun bear, muntjac, the Indochinese leopard, bamboo rat, tree shrews; among the birds the blue-winged siva and the red-billed blue magpie deserve mention.

See also
List of national parks of Thailand
List of Protected Areas Regional Offices of Thailand

References

External links

DNP
Doi Luang National Park - Tourism Thailand
Doi Luang National Park 
Chiang Rai National Parks, Mountains and Waterfalls - Chiang Rai Attractions

Geography of Chiang Rai province
Geography of Lampang province
Geography of Phayao province
Tourist attractions in Chiang Rai province
Tourist attractions in Lampang province
Tourist attractions in Phayao province
National parks of Thailand
Protected areas established in 1990
1990 establishments in Thailand
Phi Pan Nam Range